The 1973 Argentina rugby union tour of Scotland and Ireland was a series of eight matches played by the Argentina national rugby union team (the Pumas) in Scotland and Ireland in October and November 1973. The Pumas won only of two of their matches, lost four and drew the others; they lost both of their international matches, against Ireland and Scotland. Neither Ireland nor Scotland regarded the matches as full internationals and did not award caps for the games.

A Match in England was cancelled after that in May the Rugby Football Union cancelled a tour of the English national team in Argentina, worried about the political situation in the South American country.

Results 

 Munster: D.Spring; P.Pratt, P.Parfrey, S.Dennison, P.Lavery; B.Mc Gann (capt.), D.Canniffe; J.Buckley, T.Moore, S.Deering; M.Keane, B.Foley; J.Me Loughlin, P.Wheland, P.O'Callaghan.
Argentina:  A.Rodríguez Jurado; E.Morgan, R.Matarazzo, A.Travaglini, G.Pérez Leirós; H.Porta, A.Etchegaray; J.Carracedo, R.Sanz, H.Miguens (capt.); J.Virasoro, J.Fernández; F.Insúa, G.Casas, M.Carluccio. 

Ulster: G.Crothers; J.Miles.R.Patterson, R.Milliken, W.Mac Mas¬ter; A.Harrison, W.Oakes; A.S.Mac Kinney, H.Steele, J.Davison; R.Hakin, W.J.McBride (capt.); R.Clegg, K.Kennedy, P.Aghew.
Argentina:  Alonso; R.Matarazzo, A.Travaglini, A.Rodriguez Jurado, E.Morgan; T.Harris Smith, L.Gradín; J.Carracedo, H.Miguens (capt.), N.Carbone; J.Virasoro, J.Fernández; M.Carluccio, J.Dumas, R.Faríello. 

 Connacht: T.Corley; P.Flynn, N.Jennings, J.Kerin, M.Connolly; C.Smyth, M.Mahoney; T.Cuningham, M.Casserley, M.Staple¬ton; M.Me Hugh, L.Galvin (capt.); D.Frawley, B.Troy, P.Me Loughlin.
Argentina:  M.Alonso; A.Altberg.,R.Matarazzo, A.Ro¬driguez Jurado, E.Morgan; H.Porta (T.Harrís Smíth), A.Etchegaray; J.Fernández, H.Miguens (capt.), N.Carbone; C.Bottarini, J.Virasoro; F.Insúa, G.Casas, R.Fariello. 

Glasgow-Edinburgh: A.Irvine; R.Hannah, M.Hunter, I.Forisyth, L.Dick (G.Hogg); D.Reid, D.W.Morgan; G.Strachan (A.Fraser), W.Watson, J.Dixon; R.Wright, G.Brown; A.B.Carmichael, R.Balfour, A.Wilson.
Argentina:  M.Alonso; A.Altberg, R.Matarazzo, A.Travaglini, E.Morgan; T.Harris Smith, L.Gradín; J.Carracedo, R.Sanz, H.Miguens (capt.); J.Virasoro, J.Fernández; R.Fariello, J.Dumas, M.Carluccio (F.Insúa). 

 South of Scotland A.Brown A.Gill, J.Renwick, A.Cronston, A.White; C.Telfer, R.Laidlaw; C.Hegarty, C.Oliver, W.Davies; H.Bar¬nes, J.Scott; E.Pender, C.Anderson, N.Suddon
Argentina:  M.Alonso; A.Travaglini, A.Brown (R.Matarazzo), A.Rodríguez Jurado, E.Morgan; T.Harris Smith, L.Gradín; N.Carbone, R.Sanz, H.Miguens (capt.); J.Fernández, J.Virasoro; R.Fariello, J.Dumas, M.Giargia (F.Insúa). 

 North of Scotland: D.Aitchison; T.D.Dunlop, M.B.Paul, J.Adams, J.McGregory; D.Arneil e I.McRae; 1.Coull, David Leslie, Nairn McEwan; George Mackie, C.Snape; J.Braid, J.Hardie (S.Frazer), M.Clark.
Argentina:  A.Rodríguez Jurado; G.Pérez Leirós, A.Travaglini, E.Morgan, L.Gradín; H.Porta, A.Etchegaray; J.Carracedo, H.Miguens (capt.), N.Carbone; C.Bottarini, J.Fernández; F.Insúa, G.Casas, R.Fariello.

Notes

References

 Union Argentina de Rugby - Memorias 1973

1973 rugby union tours
1973
1973
1973
tour
1973–74 in Irish rugby union
1973–74 in Scottish rugby union
History of rugby union matches between Argentina and Ireland